Arleta Richardson (Flint, Michigan, March 9, 1923 – July 25, 2004) was an American religious and children's author, librarian, and a teacher.  The Grandma's Attic series was her most well known series.  She belonged to the Free Methodist Church.

Life 
Arleta spent her early life in various parts of the midwest. She served in World War II. In 1944, she graduated from Spring Arbor Junior College.  After graduation, she served in the army for over a year.  In  1949, she graduated from Western Michigan University. She worked as a teacher and a librarian at several schools including: Spring Arbor Junior College, Los Angeles Pacific College, East Los Angeles Light & Life School, and Immaculate Heart School of Library Science.  In 1974, her first novel in the Grandma's Attic series was published. Then, in 1994 the first book in her Orphans' Journey series was published.  She wrote eight books for the CYC missions program after that.  She was  Director of Missions Education in the Women's Missionary Society for nine years. At the age of 81, she died of cancer.

Awards 
  1968 ~ California Association of Christian Schools Teacher of the Year Award
  1986 ~ Writer of the Year ~ Mount Hermon Christian Writers Conference
  June 1996 ~ Alumni of the Year Award ~ Spring Arbor University

Books

Grandma's Attic 

 
 
 
 
 
 
 
 
 
 
 The first four are available in booked set.

Grandma's Attic Companion Volumes

Orphans' Journey series

Other Books

Books contributed to

References and Notes 

1923 births
2004 deaths
American children's writers
Free Methodist Church members
Writers from Flint, Michigan
Western Michigan University alumni